The Kulubnarti church is an archaeological site and former Christian church located on the island of Kulubnarti, in the village of Kulb in northern Sudan.

History

Somers Clarke published a sketch in 1912 of the island's church, its walls made of mud bricks. It was fully excavated and recorded by the anthropologist William Yewdale Adams in 1969, and plans and elevations prepared by Friedrich Hinkel.  Adams  and Peter Grossmann date the church to the 13th or 14th century, Adams having dated pottery finds in the church to that period, and Grossman concurring with the dating on the basis of stylistic comparisons.  Greek, Coptic, and Old Nubian language graffito was incised within the church. The church paintings, described by Adams in his 2011 book, were moved to the National Museum of Sudan in Khartoum.

Architecture
The small building has an almost square  area.  It is typical in all respects of the Late Christian Church Type 4d, having a rectangular rather than an apsidal sanctuary, and eastern  corner rooms entered only from the aisles, not from the sanctuary.  At the west end there is a staircase in the southwest corner room, but no corresponding room at the northwest corner.  There was probably though not certainly a tall cupola over the center of the nave. Entrance, as in all Nubian churches, is through the north and south walls near the western end.  There are three pairs of narrow slit windows high in the eastern wall, and two widely separated slit windows in the east and west walls.  The entire building consisted of mud bricks with a single layer of rough stones at ground level.

On the interior walls, fairly well preserved remains of two layers of murals were found in the east end of the sanctuary and in both aisles, but not in the eastern corner rooms.  Recognizable designs included a Nativity, a figure of Christ Pantocrator flanked by the Disciples, an archangel, and a head of Christ within a tondo, with the symbols of the Four Living Creatures projecting from it.  The murals were conserved in 1970 and are now partly on display in the Sudan National Museum.  Otherwise the church remains largely as it was when excavated, for it is above the level of waters impounded by the Aswan High Dam.

References

Further reading
William Y. Adams, Kulubnarti I, 69-77.  Sudan Archaeological Research Society Publication 18, 2011.
William Y. Adams, The Churches of Nobadia, 348-50.  Sudan Archaeological Research Society Publication 17, 2009.

Churches in Sudan
Nubian architecture in Sudan
Archaeological sites in Sudan